The 2007–08 Sussex County Football League season was the 83rd in the history of Sussex County Football League a football competition in England.

Division One

Division One featured 18 clubs which competed in the division last season, along with two new clubs, promoted from Division Two:
Pagham
St Francis Rangers

League table

Division Two

Division Two featured 15 clubs which competed in the division last season, along with three new clubs:
Littlehampton Town, relegated from Division One
Pease Pottage Village, promoted from Division Three
Rustington, promoted from Division Three

League table

Division Three

Division Three featured eleven clubs which competed in the division last season, along with two new clubs:
Dorking Wanderers, joined from the West Sussex League
Saltdean United, relegated from Division Two

League table

References

2007-08
9